Historic Centre of Guimarães is an urban space of the city of Guimarães, in Portugal, tracing back to medieval age covering an area of 16 hectares and retaining many buildings from the medieval age until 19th century. Since 2001, it is declared as a World Heritage Site of UNESCO.

Guimarães is closely linked to the formation of national identity and of Portuguese language in 12th century. It is the native city of Afonso Henriques, the first king of Portugal, who in 1139, declared independence of the country.

Gallery

See also 

 Guimarães Castle
 Braga District

External links

Municipality official website
Tourism in Guimarães

References

World Heritage Sites in Portugal
Guimarães